Khalifa Abdul Qayyum (born; 2 July 1956 – 18 October 2014) was a Pakistani politician who served as a member of the Khyber Pakhtunkhwa Assembly from 2008 to 2013.

On 26 January, a bomb planted on a motorcycle exploded in Dera Ismail Khan near Central Jail outside Town Hall. Local police officer, Abdur Rasheed said, "The bomb went off minutes after a provincial lawmaker, Khalifa Abdul Qayyum, had passed by the area. It is not clear whether Qayyum was the target, but our investigation teams have rushed to the site of the blast to collect evidence."

On 18 October 2014, Khalifa Abdul Qayyum died in Dera Ismail Khan District after a prolonged illness. His funeral prayers were offered by Maulana Abdul Rauf in Islamabad. Thousands of people including Fazlur Rehman Khalil, Aurangzaib Farooqi participated.

References

1956 births
2014 deaths
People from Dera Ismail Khan District
Khyber Pakhtunkhwa MPAs 2008–2013